The Sussex Symphony Orchestra was formed in 1993 by its current musical director Mark Andrew James. Based in Brighton, England, and consisting of both professional and amateur players, the orchestra performs large scale works and promenade concert events at venues in Sussex.

Recordings
Carr:Crowded Streets with composer Paul Carr (Contemporary, 2000) (audio CD)

British symphony orchestras
English orchestras